The city of Hamburg was one of the most powerful fortresses east of the Rhine. After being freed from Napoleonic rule by advancing Cossacks and other following Coalition troops it was once more occupied by Marshal Davout's French XIII Corps on 28 May 1813, at the height of the German Campaign during the War of the Sixth Coalition from French rule and occupation. Ordered to hold the city at all costs, Davout launched a characteristically energetic campaign against a similar numbered Army of the North made up of Prussian and other Coalition troops under the command of Count von Wallmoden-Gimborn, winning a number of minor engagements. Neither force was decidedly superior and the war ground to a halt and resulted in a rather stable front line between Lübeck and Lauenburg and further south along the Elbe river, even after the end of the cease-fire of the summer 1813. In October 1813 a French column's movement towards Dannenberg resulted in the only major engagement in the North of Germany, the Battle of the Göhrde. The defeated French troops retreated back to Hamburg.

Despite steadily shrinking manpower, food and ammunition supplies, Davout's forces displayed no signs of abandoning Hamburg. When French armies withdrew west after the lost Battle of Leipzig at the end of the year, and the Allies deployed a large portion of Bernadotte's Army of the North to watch the city during the 1814 campaign for France. Davout was still in control of Hamburg when the War of the Sixth Coalition ended in April, and eventually capitulated to Russian forces under General Bennigsen on 27 May 1814, obeying orders delivered by General Gérard from the new king of France, Louis XVIII.

Strengths
French forces are estimated to 42,000 (Including 10,000 Danes and 8,000 wounded
Allied force are estimated to 52,000 in the start (Ludwig von Wallmoden-Gimborn's corps) to 120,000 in the seat area, in January 1814, when Levin August, Count von Bennigsen took command.

Other
During Davout's defense of Hamburg, one type of silver coin was issued.  The design of the 32 schilling coin of 1809 was reused, and the date was not changed, but the mintmaster's initials were changed from HSK (for Hans Schierven Knoph) to CAIG (for C. A. J. Ginquembre, who was the French director of the mint in 1813).  The coins were issued in 1813, and are listed in the Standard Catalog of World Coins 1801-1900 by Krause Publications as type number KM242 for Hamburg.

See also
 List of Napoleonic battles

Notes

References

Further reading

External links

Sieges of the Napoleonic Wars
1810s in Hamburg
1813 in Germany
Conflicts in 1813
Sieges involving Prussia
Sieges involving France
Sieges involving Russia
Conflicts in 1814